is a Japanese footballer.

He previously played with Japanese side Blaublitz Akita, Albirex Niigata FC (Singapore)., OFK Grbalj in the 2012–13 Montenegrin First League, then with Kapfenberger SV in the 2014–15 Austrian Football First League, another Austrian side FC Lankowitz, and Deutschlandsberger SC in the Austrian Regionalliga, having already played with them earlier in second half of 2013–14 season.

References

1987 births
Living people
Japanese footballers
Association football defenders
Blaublitz Akita players
Albirex Niigata Singapore FC players
Expatriate footballers in Singapore
OFK Grbalj players
Montenegrin First League players
Expatriate footballers in Montenegro
Kapfenberger SV players
Expatriate footballers in Austria
Austrian Regionalliga players
Japanese expatriates in Montenegro
Japanese expatriates in Austria
Japanese expatriates in Singapore